The Seven Second Summits are the second-highest mountains of each of the seven continents. All of these mountain peaks are separate peaks rather than a sub-peak of the continents' high point. The Seven Second Summits are considered a harder challenge than the traditional Seven Summits.

Definitions

What constitutes a continent is a matter of some dispute among mountaineers seeking to complete this challenge. The main ridge of the Greater Caucasus range is generally considered to form the boundary between Europe and Asia. In that case, Mount Elbrus, situated some 10 km north of the continental divide, is the highest mountain in Europe. Excluding the Caucasus Mountains, Mont Blanc would be Europe's highest mountain.

The Australian continent is defined as comprising the mainland of Australia and proximate islands on the same continental shelf, including Tasmania and New Guinea. In the convention of the seven continents, one of the continents is the region of Australasia, which includes, for example, the mountainous islands of New Zealand. 

For both the geological and conventional continent, New Guinea's Carstensz Pyramid is the highest summit. When considering a continent as a continuous landmass surrounded by oceans, mainland Australia would be its own continent, with Mount Kosciuszko as its highest summit.

Bass and Messner lists
The Seven Second Summits list follows the Seven Summits list from Richard Bass, which uses Mount Kosciuszko (2,228 m) to represent the Australian continent's highest summit. Reinhold Messner proposed another list (the Messner or Carstensz list), replacing Mount Kosciuszko with Western New Guinea's Carstensz Pyramid, which is part of Indonesia (4,884 m). Following the Bass list, Mount Townsend is the second-highest summit (2,209 m) in Australia. According to the Messner list, Puncak Mandala (4,760 m) on New Guinea is the second highest of the Australian continent. Heights of mountain peaks in West Papua are poorly established, and Puncak Trikora has been listed as the second-highest summit on the island, but SRTM data do support a higher elevation for Mandala.

Both lists count Mount Elbrus as the highest peak in Europe. This makes Dykh-Tau (5,205 m), located in Russia, the second-highest summit in Europe. Those who consider Mont Blanc to be the highest mountain in Europe would consider Monte Rosa (4,634 m), located between Switzerland and Italy, to be the second-highest summit.

Climbing history
Austrian mountaineer Christian Stangl became the first person to successfully climb the Second Seven Summits. Stangl climbed all possible candidates for the Second Seven Summits quest (K2, Mount Logan, Ojos del Salado, Batian, Mount Tyree, Dych Tau, Dufourspitze, Sumantri, Ngga Pulu, Puncak Trikora, Puncak Mandala and Mount Townsend) to exclude any errors and to satisfy all geographers. He finished the quest on 15 January 2013 and was certified by Guinness World Records on 17 September 2013. Later, he also completed the Challenge for the Seven Third Summits.

In 2012 the Italian mountaineer Hans Kammerlander claimed to be the first person to complete the Seven Second Summits, but doubts were raised about his ascent of Mount Logan. Kammerlander also climbed Puncak Trikora, which is now believed to be slightly lower than Puncak Mandala.

Comparison with Seven Summits 
The presentation of the Second Seven Summits concept and its relative difficulty was first published in January 1997 by Rock and Ice Magazine (#77) in the article The Second Seven Summits written by mountaineer and writer David D. Keaton. Later that year, the author Jon Krakauer in his book Into Thin Air echoed those sentiments by writing that it would be a bigger challenge to climb the second-highest peak of each continent instead of the highest. In the climbing community, mountaineers such as Rob Hall had previously discussed the idea.

In Asia, K2 demands greater technical climbing skills than Everest, while altitude-related factors such as the thinness of the atmosphere, high winds, and low temperatures remain much the same.

In Africa, the summit of Mount Kenya is a rock climb, while Mount Kilimanjaro can be ascended without any technical difficulty.

In North America, some sources consider Mount Logan a more difficult climb than Denali, although the climbing and outdoor recreation website Summitpost considers Logan no more difficult than Denali because it is neither technical nor steep. Mountaineer Mark Horrell, in a 2012 post on his blog, considered Mount Logan to be no more difficult technically than Denali, but much more difficult to approach.

In South America, Ojos del Salado involves a short scramble while Aconcagua is just a walk. Horrell acknowledged that Ojos del Salado was more technically difficult, but considered Aconcagua a greater challenge because of physical demands.

In Europe, Dykh-Tau is a considerably harder climb than Mount Elbrus. According to Horrell, the main route on Elbrus is "long and physically tiring, but it’s not technically difficult," while Dykh-Tau's "easiest is graded at Russian alpine 4B, which involves steep rock sections and 55 degree snow and ice slopes."

In Australasia, the continent's Second Summit on the Bass list, Mount Townsend, is more challenging than Mount Kosciuszko, but still just a walk-up. The normal route on the highest peak of the Messner list, Puncak Jaya, is technically difficult (UIAA grade V+). Puncak Mandala, however, is extremely challenging with respect to the approach route, which is arguably the more significant problem in climbing the New Guinea peaks. There have been perhaps only two successful approaches (and climbs) reported.

In Antarctica, Mount Vinson presents little difficulty beyond normal challenges of Antarctica (the guiding company Adventure Peaks rates the ascent at PD/AD on the Alpine scale), but Mount Tyree requires technical climbing, and it has been climbed by a total of fifteen people since its discovery.

See also 
 Seven Summits
 Seven Third Summits
 Volcanic Seven Summits
 Three Poles Challenge
 Explorers Grand Slam, also known as The Adventurers Grand Slam
 Eight-thousander

References

External links 
Peak Bagger
Climbing Carstensz Pyramid, Papua Indonesia

 
.02
Peak bagging